Charles W. Calhoun (Born: Feb 24, 1948) is an American historian and academic. He is a professor at East Carolina University.  He holds a  BA, from Yale University;  PhD, Columbia University. Calhoun is a member of the editorial board of the Journal of the Gilded Age and Progressive Era. He lives in Greenville, North Carolina.

Works

See also
 Ulysses S. Grant
 Gilded age

References

External links

Living people
1948 births
East Carolina University faculty